Plaster Stadium may refer to:

 Plaster Stadium (Southwest Baptist), in Bolivar, Missouri, U.S.
 Robert W. Plaster Stadium, in Springfield, Missouri, U.S.